The 1950 Masters Tournament was the 14th Masters Tournament, held April 6–9 at Augusta National Golf Club in Augusta, Georgia. Jimmy Demaret won at 283 (−5) and became the first three-time Masters champion, with previous wins in 1940 and 1947. He played the par-five 13th hole (Azalea) in six-under-par for the week, with two eagles and two birdies at the pivotal  hole.

Third round leader Jim Ferrier, a naturalized American originally from Australia, bogeyed five of the final six holes for 75 (+3) and was two strokes back as runner-up. Defending champion Sam Snead was third at 287 (−1). 
 
Ben Hogan played in his first major since his near-fatal automobile accident in early 1949. In second place after 54 holes, he shot a 76 (+4) in the final round and fell back to even par for the week, in a tie for fourth place with Byron Nelson. Hogan won the next three majors he entered: the 1950 U.S. Open, 1951 Masters, and 1951 U.S. Open.

The tournament drew an estimated 10,000 patrons on Saturday and 18,000 on Sunday. With the favorable turnout, host Bobby Jones increased the original purse of $10,000 to $12,000.

Field
1. Masters champions
Jimmy Demaret (7,9,12), Claude Harmon (9,10), Herman Keiser (9), Byron Nelson (2,6,9), Henry Picard (6,9), Gene Sarazen (2,4,6), Horton Smith (9,10), Sam Snead (4,6,7,9.10,12)
Ralph Guldahl (2,10) and Craig Wood (2) did not play.

2. U.S. Open champions
Billy Burke, Johnny Farrell, Ben Hogan (6,7), Lawson Little (3,5,9), Lloyd Mangrum (7,9,10,12), Cary Middlecoff (9,10), Lew Worsham (9)

3. U.S. Amateur champions
Dick Chapman (8,a), Charles Coe (9,11,a), Skee Riegel (8,10)

4. British Open champions
Denny Shute (6)

5. British Amateur champions
Frank Stranahan (8,9,a), Robert Sweeny Jr. (a)

6. PGA champions
Jim Ferrier (9,10,12), Vic Ghezzi, Bob Hamilton (7,9)

7. Members of the U.S. 1949 Ryder Cup team
Skip Alexander, Chick Harbert (10), Dutch Harrison (9), Clayton Heafner (9,10,12), Johnny Palmer (9,10,12)

8. Members of the U.S. 1949 Walker Cup team
Tommy Barnes (a), Chuck Kocsis (a), Jim McHale Jr. (a)

Ray Billows (a), Ted Bishop (3,a), Charles Coe (3,a), Johnny Dawson (9,11,a), Bruce McCormick (a) and Willie Turnesa (3,5,11,a) did not play. Barnes was a reserve for the team.

9. Top 24 players and ties from the 1949 Masters Tournament
Herman Barron, Johnny Bulla (10), Pete Cooper (10), Leland Gibson, Joe Kirkwood Jr., Toney Penna, Jim Turnesa (10)

10. Top 24 players and ties from the 1949 U.S. Open
Al Brosch, Dave Douglas, Fred Haas, Jack Isaacs, Les Kennedy, Eric Monti, Herschel Spears, Harry Todd, Gene Webb, Buck White

Ellsworth Vines did not play.

11. 1949 U.S. Amateur quarter-finalists
Julius Boros, William C. Campbell (a), Rufus King (a), Harold Paddock Jr. (a), Frank Strafaci (a)

12. 1949 PGA Championship quarter-finalists
Ray Wade Hill, Henry Williams Jr.

13. One amateur, not already qualified, selected by a ballot of ex-U.S. Amateur champions
Harvie Ward (a)

14. One professional, not already qualified, selected by a ballot of ex-U.S. Open champions
Jack Burke Jr.

15. Two players, not already qualified, with the best scoring average in the winter part of the 1950 PGA Tour
George Fazio, Henry Ransom

16 Winner of  1949 Inter-service Invitational tournament
Fred Moseley (a)

17 Home club professional
Ed Dudley

18. Foreign invitations
Roberto De Vicenzo, Tony Holguin (9), Norman Von Nida

Numbers in brackets indicate categories that the player would have qualified under had they been American.

Round summaries

First round
Thursday, April 6, 1950

Source:

Second round
Friday, April 7, 1950

Source:

Third round
Saturday, April 8, 1950

Source:

Final round
Sunday, April 9, 1950

Final leaderboard

Sources:

Scorecard

Cumulative tournament scores, relative to par

Source:

References

External links
Masters.com – past winners and results
Augusta.com – 1950 Masters leaderboard and scorecards

1950
1950 in golf
1950 in American sports
1950 in sports in Georgia (U.S. state)
April 1950 sports events in the United States